Anthony Terlato (May 11, 1934 – June 29, 2020) was an Italian-American wine executive who was chairman of Terlato Wines, a Lake Bluff, Illinois-based wine importer, producer and marketer. He has been called "The Father of Pinot Grigio" for his early role in bringing the now-ubiquitous varietal to the American market in the late 1970s when it was practically unknown outside Europe. He has been credited as a key figure in the shift in American wine tastes from "mass-produced, sweet, fortified jug wines ... to the likes of classified-growth Bordeaux, top Italian estates, and the best wineries in California that are enjoyed by many today."

Early life and education
Terlato was originally from Brooklyn. 
Terlato's career in wine began in 1955 on Chicago's North Side at his father’s wine and spirits store, Leading Liquor Marts.  While there, he saw an emerging market for fine wines in the United States.

Career
In 1956, Terlato joined his father-in-law’s wine-bottling firm, Pacific Wine Company.  He soon established relationships with Alexis Lichine and Frank Schoonmaker – two pioneer importers.  At age 29, Terlato was named president of Pacific Wine Company.
In the late 1960s, Terlato expanded Paterno Imports, which imported olive oil, to import fine wines.  In 1979, he introduced Santa Margherita Pinot Grigio to the United States and over the next 25 years turned it into one of the most successful wine imports in American history – it was the most popular imported wine in Wine & Spirits magazine's annual restaurant poll from 1995 to 2008.

In the late 1980s, Terlato began adding wines from producers throughout Europe.  In 1996, he made the family’s first winery purchase: Rutherford Hill Winery in Napa Valley.  In  2000, the Terlato family purchased Chimney Rock Winery, also in Napa Valley, and in 2002, they added Sanford Winery in the Sta Rita Hills appellation of Santa Barbara County to their portfolio of wineries.

For his role in introducing Italian wines to America, Terlato was conferred the decoration of Cavaliere Ufficiale, Motu Proprio in 1984, the first American in the wine industry to receive this decoration.

Personal life
In the course of his career, Terlato was exposed to and/or befriended  many of the wine and food industry’s notable participants and innovators, including  winemakers Baron Phillippe de Rothschild and his daughter Baroness Philippine de Rothschild, Christian Moueix,  Jean Michel Cazes, Angelo Gaja, Michel Chapoutier, Michael Twelftree and Robert Mondavi and chef/Restaurateurs Julia Child, Jean Joho,  Charlie Trotter and Lidia Bastianich.

Terlato died on the morning of June 29, 2020, aged 86.

Honors and awards

 Cavaliere Ufficiale, Motu Proprio, Government of Italy, 1984
 Wine Enthusiast’s Man of the Year Award, 2002 
 Wine Spectator’s Distinguished Service Award, 2004
 Horatio Alger Award, 2006 
 American Chamber of Commerce in Italy Wine Excellence Award, 2010 
 Wine Enthusiast's Lifetime Achievement Award, 2015

Books
Terlato's memoir, TASTE: A Life in Wine was published in 2008 by Agate Publishing.

See also
List of wine personalities
Kermit Lynch
Robert Mondavi

References

External links
 Terlato Vineyards
 Terlato Wines
 A family that works — and drinks and eats — together Crain’s Chicago Business, SHIA KAPOS, June 19, 2015

1934 births
2020 deaths
American winemakers
Wine merchants
Businesspeople from Brooklyn
Writers from Brooklyn
Businesspeople from Chicago
Writers from Chicago